Bryndzové halušky is one of the national dishes in Slovakia. This meal consists of halušky (boiled lumps of potato dough similar in appearance to gnocchi) and bryndza (a soft sheep cheese), optionally sprinkled with cooked bits of smoked pork fat or bacon, and chives or spring onions.

Žinčica is traditionally drunk with this meal. There is an annual Bryndzové Halušky festival in Turecká that features an eating contest.

See also

Strapačky

References

External links

Slovak cuisine
Potato dishes
Cheese dishes
Dumplings
National dishes